Milk Inside a Bag of Milk Inside a Bag of Milk (stylized as Milk inside a bag of milk inside a bag of milk...) is a 2020 psychological horror visual novel game developed by Russian game developer Nikita Kryukov. The game centers around an unnamed female protagonist who visits a nearby grocery market to purchase a bag of milk, but is troubled with the challenges of suffering from severe trauma and psychosis. The player plays as a voice inside her head with which she shares an inner monologue.

The game was published to Steam by Missing Calm on August 26, 2020. On November 11, 2022, the game and its sequel were ported to the Nintendo Switch by Forever Entertainment.

Gameplay
Milk Inside a Bag of Milk Inside a Bag of Milk is a brief game, taking roughly 20 minutes to complete. The game consists of clicking through text to progress the plot, until a dialogue selection is presented. These selections have minimal influence on the outcome of the game. The game contains no branching paths or alternate endings, the only exception to this is if the player chooses to continue to select negative or unhelpful dialogue options, to which the girl will stop listening to them, ending the game. 

The graphics of Milk Inside a Bag of Milk use a three shade monochromatic color palette with low resolution. Much of the dialogue contains fourth wall-breaching and elements of anti-humor.

Reception
Lilia Hellal of Rice Digital praised the game's unique visuals and storytelling, writing that "Equipped with a strong, distinctive production style thanks to its disturbing retro art and the foreboding discomfort of its droning music, it’s a memorable indie gem that will never be forgotten once experienced". Jesse Grodman from DreadXP likewise found the game's visual style, writing and aesthetics "fantastic", but notes that what makes the game really great is how it handles the subject matter of mental health, suicidal thoughts and familial abuse. Kyle Caldwell at Pixel Die found the game to be short and tight, and surprisingly effective in getting the player to care about the protagonist in the short amount of time you get to spend with her. John Walker of Buried Treasure rated the game 8/10 and found that it dealt with the subject of trauma in an especially honest matter not in spite of, but because the player is unable to save the protagonist. Kohei Fujita of IGN Japan placed the game eight on his personal 2022 game of the year list.

Sequel
On February 19, 2021, Kryukov announced that a sequel was in development. On December 16, 2021, the sequel was published by Kryukov under the title Milk outside a bag of milk outside a bag of milk, colloquially referred to as "Milk 2" by fans.

The sequel continues the story where the previous installment ends. After purchasing the bag of milk in the original installment, the girl returns home, where her abusive mother confronts and attacks her. After the attack, the girl retreats to her bedroom, where she prepares for the night and attempts to fall asleep.

The sequel contains short but fully animated cutscenes and branching paths with alternate endings. The graphics are less abstract and no longer rendered in monochrome. And while the original game was mostly told from a first-person perspective, the sequel has the player looking at the girl, rather than look through her eyes, revealing what she looks like. The game takes on a style that is more common among visual novels where text boxes are accompanied by a drawing of their speaker.

Kerry Brunskill of PCGamer praised the game for not succumbing to the "natural urge" to provide a fix-it for its suffering protagonist, writing that "this lack of answers or any insulting magical fix for a serious and all-consuming state of being hit my soul with the force of a hurricane."

Notes

See also 
 Doki Doki Literature Club!
 Omori

References

External links

2020 video games
Forever Entertainment games
Indie video games
Linux games
MacOS games
Monochrome video games
Nintendo Switch games
Psychological horror games
Ren'Py games
Single-player video games
Surrealist video games
Video games about mental health
Video games developed in Russia
Video games featuring female protagonists
Visual novels
Windows games
Works about depression